11-11: En mi cuadra nada cuadra (English title: 11-11: In my block nothing matches) is an American teen telenovela on Nickelodeon Latin America starring Patricio Gallardo, Alberich Bormann and Thali García with Kevin Aponte and Karla Cervantes as the antagonists.

Series overview

Cast and characters

Main characters 
 Patricio Gallardo as Enrique "Kike" Calderón, a young man who came to live in building 11-11 where he met a beautiful girl named sandra, whom he fell in love with, but he discovers a great secret that was hidden in the building.
 Alberich Bormann as Enrique Calderón, this character is the adult version of Kike which opts for life when Kike sleeps for the first time in one of the 3 beds that Don Leonardo invented.
 Thali García as Sandra Jiménez, a talented young woman who can sing and Kike falls in love with seeing her for the first time.
 Kevin Aponte as Esteban Restrepo, series antagonist; is son of Don Maximiliano Restrepo owner of building 11-11, and one of the lovers of Sandra.
 Karla Cervantes as Virginia Ramos
 Reinaldo Zavarce as Juan José "Juanjo" Seminario
 Carolina Ayala as Ana Teresa
 Ana Belén Lander as Karina Calderón
 Virginia Núñez as Anabela
 Hernán Canto as Valentino
 Daniela de la Fe as Denisse 
 Emeraude Toubia as Elizabeth
 Andrea Martínez as Ana
 Silvana Arias as Mariana Valle
 Óscar Priego as Joaquín Mendoza

Recurring characters 
 Ismael La Rosa as Jaime Calderón
 Henry Zakka as Don Camilo
 Ricardo Silva as Don Maximiliano Restrepo
 Liliana Rodríguez as Tía Lucrecía
 Estefany Oliveira as Sharon Restrepo
 Flor Núñez as Doña Consuelo
 Jullye Giliberti as Susana Jiménez
 Sandra Destenave as Patricia

Special guest stars 
 Fanny Lu as Danna
 Prince Royce as himself

Awards and nominations

References

2013 telenovelas
American telenovelas
Children's telenovelas
Spanish-language telenovelas
2013 American television series debuts
2013 American television series endings
Nickelodeon telenovelas
Spanish-language Nickelodeon original programming